Green Bay Township may refer to the following townships in the United States:

 Green Bay Township, Clarke County, Iowa
 Green Bay Township, Lee County, Iowa